The Ontario Open is a golf tournament on the PGA Tour Canada that is held in Ontario, Canada.

It was founded in 1923 and held every year through 1979, when the Peter Jackson Tour ended. After a long hiatus, an attempted revival in 1989 lasted only one year before the tournament returned for a five year run from 1992 to 1996, during which it was sponsored by the town of Newmarket, Ontario in the first year and then by Export "A" cigarettes. Another lengthy hiatus followed until the tournament returned as a non-tour event in 2019. The following year, it rejoined the tour schedule.

Through 1947 the Ontario Open was a simple 36-hole medal. Except for a three year span from 1960 to 1962 when it was a 72-hole event, from 1948 until it was cancelled in 1979 it was a 54-hole event. Except for 2019, it has been played as a 72-hole event every year since its first revival.

Winners

References

External links

PGA Tour Canada events
Golf tournaments in Ontario
Recurring sporting events established in 1923